The 2009–10 Liga II was the 70th season of the second tier of the Romanian football league system. The season started on 15 August 2009 and ended on 5 June 2010.

The format has been maintained to two series, each of them consisting of 18 teams. At the end of the season, the top two teams of the series promoted to Liga I and the bottom fifth places from both series relegated to Liga III. Two more teams relegated this season due to the format changing applied starting with the next season.

Team changes

To Liga II
Promoted from Liga III
 Râmnicu Sărat
 Steaua II București
 Victoria Brănești
 Gaz Metan CFR Craiova
 Fortuna Covaci
 Baia Mare
 Tricolorul Breaza
 Silvania Șimleu Silvaniei
 Săgeata Stejaru**

Relegated from Liga I
 Argeș Pitești**
 Farul Constanța
 Otopeni
 Gloria Buzău

From Liga II
Relegated to Liga III
 Liberty Salonta**
 Buftea**
 Știința Bacău
 ACU Arad
 Progresul București
 Prefab Modelu
 FCM Târgoviște
 Forex Brașov
 Mechel Câmpia Turzii

Promoted to Liga I
 Ceahlăul Piatra Neamț
 Unirea Alba Iulia
 FC Ploiești
 Internațional Curtea de Argeș

Note (**)
FC Argeș Pitești was relegated for match fixing, Gaz Metan Mediaș, which initially relegated, was spared from relegation.

CS Buftea sold its Liga II place to third tier club Săgeata Stejaru.

Liberty Salonta withdrew at the end of the season, CFR Timișoara, which initially relegated, was spared from relegation.

League tables

Seria I

Seria II

Top Scorers

Seria I
23 goals
 Viorel Ferfelea  (Sportul Studențesc) 

20 goals
 Costin Curelea (Sportul Studențesc) 

16 goals
 Vasile Olariu (Victoria Brănești) 

5 goals
 Marius Nae (Sportul Studențesc)

Seria II
15 goals
 Paul Batin (UTA Arad) 

13 goals
 Valentin Lemnaru (Universitatea Cluj) 

12 goals
 Victor Astafei (Arieșul Turda) 
 Kallé Soné (Otopeni) 
 Raymond Lukács (Bihor Oradea) 
 Dan Roman (Târgu Mureș) 
 Adrian Voiculeț (Argeș Pitești) 

7 goals
 Adrian Dulcea (Argeș Pitești) 

6 goals
 Iulian Tameș (Argeș Pitești) 

5 goals
 Robert Roszel (Baia Mare)

See also

 2009–10 Liga I
 2009–10 Liga III
 2009–10 Liga IV

References

Liga II seasons
Rom
2009–10 in Romanian football